Field Marshal  Henry Seymour Conway (1721 – 9 July 1795) was a British general and statesman.  A brother of the 1st Marquess of Hertford, and cousin of Horace Walpole, he began his military career in the War of the Austrian Succession. He held various political offices including Chief Secretary for Ireland, Secretary of State for the Southern Department, Leader of the House of Commons and Secretary of State for the Northern Department. He eventually rose to the position of Commander-in-Chief of the Forces.

Family and education
Conway was the second son of Francis Seymour-Conway, 1st Baron Conway (whose elder brother Popham Seymour-Conway had inherited the Conway estates) by his third wife, Charlotte Seymour-Conway (née Shorter). He entered Eton College in 1732 and from that time enjoyed a close friendship with his cousin Horace Walpole.

Early army career
Conway joined the Molesworth's Regiment of Dragoons on 27 June 1737 as a lieutenant. He was transferred to the 1st Foot Guards and was promoted to captain on 14 February 1741 and to captain-lieutenant (the equivalent of lieutenant colonel) on 10 May 1742.

During the War of Austrian Succession he served on the staff of Field Marshal George Wade at Dettingen in June 1743 and on the staff of the Duke of Cumberland at the Fontenoy in May 1745. Appointed colonel of the 48th Foot on 6 April 1746, he took part in Culloden later that month during the Jacobite Rebellion. His next battle, in July 1747, was at Lauffeld, in which he narrowly escaped death, being captured by the French but released on parole a few days later. In July 1749, he transferred from the 48th Foot to the 34th Foot, and served with his regiment in the garrison of Menorca in 1751.

Early political career
Conway was elected unopposed to the Irish Parliament in 1741 for Antrim County, and to the British Parliament for Higham Ferrers in December 1741 on the recommendation of Sir Robert Walpole. He was elected in 1747 for Penryn and for St Mawes in 1754, both in the Boscawen interest. He was promoted to major-general on 12 March 1755.

In April 1755, he was unexpectedly appointed Chief Secretary for Ireland by William Cavendish, Marquess of Hartington, the new Lord Lieutenant. He then finally took his seat for County Antrim in the Irish House of Commons in October 1755. It was hoped that he would resolve the conflict in Irish politics between the Speaker, Henry Boyle on the one side and George Stone, Archbishop of Armagh and John Ponsonby: ultimately, he reached a compromise, acceptable to the British Ministry, in which Boyle was bought off with an earldom and John Ponsonby became Speaker. He became a Groom of the Bedchamber in April 1757 to both George II and George III (until 1764).

Seven Years' War

Conway was the British military second in command on the Rochefort expedition in 1757, and repeatedly advocated an attack on Fort Fouras, but his colleagues would only agree a night attack (which failed).  Ultimately the expedition returned to Portsmouth having achieved nothing. Though Mordaunt (the commander in chief) was acquitted by his court-martial, the affair damaged both their reputations. In his displeasure, George II refused to employ Conway on the 1758 campaigns. He was not employed again until the next reign, except that he was sent to sign a cartel for an exchange of prisoners at Sluys in 1759. On 21 April 1759 he became colonel of the 1st The Royal Dragoons and on 25 August 1759 he was promoted to lieutenant general.

In 1761, he served in Germany as deputy to John Manners, Marquess of Granby, the British commander in the army led by Ferdinand of Brunswick.  At the Battle of Villinghausen in July 1761 he commanded a corps which was at the centre of the line and not attacked. He was also present at the Battle of Wilhelmsthal in June 1762, and captured the castle of Waldeck the following month. After peace preliminaries were signed at Fontainebleau in November, he supervised the embarkation of British troops from Europe, returning to England in March.

Later political career
Conway was re-elected to the House of Commons in April 1761, this time for Thetford and on 4 July 1761 he became a member of the Privy Council. As a senior member of the Rockingham faction of the Whigs, he opposed the King's legal actions against the reformist John Wilkes in 1763 which resulted in his dismissal in 1764 as a Groom of the Bedchamber and as Colonel of the 1st Royal Dragoons. This led to the publication of accusation and counter-accusation in pamphlets, as it was feared that the government intended to purge the army of its political opponents.

He entered office with Lord Rockingham as Secretary of State for the Southern Department in July 1765 before switching to the Northern Department in May 1766, serving until January 1768, when he became a Minister without Portfolio.  In these offices, Conway sought to urge a moderate policy towards the American colonies, being the principal supporter of the repeal of the Stamp Act, and opposing the taxation policies of Chancellor of the Exchequer Charles Townshend.

Return to the Army
Following his resignation in January 1768, Conway returned to the military, and was made a full general on 26 May 1772 and Governor of Jersey on 22 October 1772. He remained an important figure in the Commons, opposing the British attempt to suppress the American Revolt. He was rewarded with a cabinet position and the office of Commander-in-Chief of the Forces in the new Rockingham ministry in March 1782. His political career came to an end in 1784 when he lost his seat in parliament due to his opposition to the new government of William Pitt and he focused thereafter on his military responsibilities retaining his post as Commander-in Chief until his complete retirement in January 1793. He was promoted to field marshal on 18 October 1793 and died, at his home, Park Place at Remenham in Berkshire, on 9 July 1795.

Family
On 19 December 1747 he married Caroline, the widow of Charles Bruce, 4th Earl of Elgin and 3rd Earl of Ailesbury, and daughter of Lieutenant-General John Campbell, later the 4th Duke of Argyll.  They had one daughter, the sculptor Anne Seymour Damer.

See also
 Conway's Bridge at Park Place

References

Sources

External links
 

1721 births
1795 deaths
1st The Royal Dragoons officers
4th Queen's Own Hussars officers
5th Royal Irish Lancers officers
7th Dragoon Guards officers
13th Hussars officers
34th Regiment of Foot officers
48th Regiment of Foot officers
British Army personnel of the Jacobite rising of 1745
British Army personnel of the Seven Years' War
British Army personnel of the War of the Austrian Succession
British field marshals
British Army personnel of the American Revolutionary War
British MPs 1747–1754
British MPs 1754–1761
British MPs 1761–1768
British MPs 1774–1780
British MPs 1780–1784
British Secretaries of State
Governors of Jersey
Grenadier Guards officers
Henry Seymour Conway
Younger sons of barons
Irish MPs 1727–1760
Irish MPs 1761–1768
Members of the Parliament of Great Britain for English constituencies
People educated at Eton College
People from Remenham
Royal Horse Guards officers
Whig (British political party) MPs for English constituencies
Members of the Parliament of Great Britain for constituencies in Cornwall
Leaders of the House of Commons of Great Britain
Members of the Privy Council of Great Britain
Members of the Privy Council of Ireland
Chief Secretaries for Ireland
Members of the Parliament of Ireland (pre-1801) for County Antrim constituencies